ʿAyn Qasiyya is an Early Epipalaeolithic archaeological site in the Azraq Oasis, Jordan; the remains of a lakeside camp used by hunter-gatherers around 20,000 years ago. Located near the aquifer-fed spring, at the time the site was occupied it was surrounded by a substantial wetland, attracting a wide range of animals which were hunted by the inhabitants. The stone tools found at the site are associated with both the Kebaran and Nebekian cultures, suggesting that it was visited by people from different cultural groups. Human burials have also been found at the site, which is rare for this period.

References 

Archaeological sites in Jordan
Kebaran culture